Andrew Bird (born December, 1956) is a British-born film editor. He has worked mostly in the German cinema.   He has edited multiple films including The Edge of Heaven, Soul Kitchen and Head-On.

External links

1956 births
British film editors
Living people
Place of birth missing (living people)